Carex gracillima, called the graceful sedge or purple-sheathed graceful sedge, is a species of flowering plant in the genus Carex, native to central and eastern Canada and the central and eastern United States. It prefers to grow in shady, wet woodlands and similar habitats.

References

gracillima
Flora of Eastern North America
Plants described in 1824